Emre Kıvılcım (born 2 September 1990) is a Turkish actor, model and former chemical engineer.

Biography 
Kıvılcım, who was born in Malatya and graduated in 2012, began acting in 2014 by starring in the film Zeytiyağlı Yiyylı Aman. Then he appeared in the TV series Elif and then the film Cinayet-i Aşk. The main profession of the actor, who became famous for playing Selim in Elif for 3 years, was chemical engineering. He said that his childhood dream was to become an actor and he had left chemical engineering for acting. The actor also masters horseback riding, sword-wielding and martial arts. Kıvılcım, who is known for starring in the film Türkler Geliyor: Adaletin Kılıcı, now stars in the Turkish-Uzbek TV series Mendirman Jaloliddin.

Filmography

Films

Television

Reality television

References

External links 

 
 

Living people
1991 births
Turkish male film actors
Turkish male models
Turkish male television actors
Turkish male stage actors
People from Malatya